The Society of the Missionaries of St. Francis Xavier, Pilar, abbreviated SFX and commonly referred to as the Society of Pilar or the Pilar Fathers is a Roman Catholic 
society of apostolic life of Pontifical Right for men (priests and brothers). Its members add the nominal letters S.F.X. after their names to indicate their membership in the Congregation.

History
The Society was formed on September 26, 1887, at Agonda (Canacona)  by a priest in south Goa, India named Father José Bento Martins Ribeiro, who, together with his three companions, decided to dedicate their lives for the service of God's people. Their aim was to serve the diaspora Catholics of the predominantly non catholic areas of Goa called the 'Nova Conquistas' and to proclaim the Gospel in these areas. In 1890, the headquarters of the Society were transferred from Agonda to Pilar where the Society has its Mother House today. In 1891, the Society's Rules (Constitution) were approved by a local bishop. Father Bento Martins became the Society's first superior. 

The Society grew slowly. From 1887 to 1934, the Society had no more than a total 21 members, and from 1896 to 1934 the Society never exceeded eight priests at one time.

In 1939, when only one member remained, the Society was reorganised, primarily by Fr. Conceicao Rodrigues and Fr. Francisco Sequeira with four others. Today the Society is spread over 38 dioceses in India and 8 dioceses abroad with 3 Bishops, 383 priest members and 9 lay brothers.  Its Generalate is in Porvorim Goa, and its mother house is in Pilar Goa.

See also
 http://www.delhiprovincesfx.com/Default.aspx
 http://societyofpilarkolkataprovince.org/history_prov.html
 Agnel Ashram
 Fr. Agnel Multipurpose School and Junior College
 Fr. Agnel School, New Delhi
 Fr. Agnel School, Noida
 Fr. Agnel Stadium
 Fr. Conceicao Rodrigues Institute of Technology
 Fr. Conceicao Rodrigues College of Engineering
 Fr. Conceicao Rodrigues Memorial Debate
 Agnelo de Souza
 Aleixo das Neves Dias

References

External links
 Official Society of the Missionaries of St. Francis Xavier, Pilar website
 Seminary history

Christian seminaries and theological colleges in India
Catholic seminaries
Christianity in Goa
Colonial Goa
Education in North Goa district
Societies of apostolic life
Educational institutions established in 1887
1887 establishments in India
1880s establishments in Portuguese India